The Junction may refer to:

Places
 The Junction, a neighbourhood in Toronto, Ontario, Canada
 The Junction, New South Wales, a suburb of Newcastle, New South Wales, Australia
 The Junction (Vancouver), a gay bar and nightclub in Vancouver, British Columbia, Canada
 The Junction, former name of Vaughan, Victoria, Australia
 The intersection of Flatbush and Nostrand Avenues in Brooklyn, New York City, U.S., locally called "The Junction"

Music and media
 The Junction (band), a rock band from Brampton, Ontario, Canada
 The Junction (The Junction album), their self-titled album
 The Junction (The Manhattan Transfer album), a 2018 album by jazz vocal group The Manhattan Transfer
 "The Junction" (The Twilight Zone), an episode of The New Twilight Zone

See also
 Junction (disambiguation)
 The Junction Boys (film), a 2002 American made-for-television sports drama film
 Up the Junction (song), a 1979 single by Squeeze
 Up the Junction (soundtrack), a 1968 studio album by Manfred Mann
 Up the Junction (The Wednesday Play), a 1965 episode of the BBC anthology drama series The Wednesday Play